The New York County Lawyers' Association Building is a structure at 14 Vesey Street between Broadway and Church Street in the Financial District  of Manhattan, New York City. It was built in 1929–30 and was designed by architect Cass Gilbert in the English Georgian style for the Association, which was founded in 1908. Gilbert's design complements Trinity Church's St. Paul's Chapel, which sits across the street.
 
The building, which remains the NYCLA's headquarters, was designated a New York City landmark in 1965, and was added to the National Register of Historic Places in 1982.

See also
National Register of Historic Places listings in Manhattan below 14th Street
List of New York City Designated Landmarks in Manhattan below 14th Street

References
Notes

External links

1928 establishments in New York City
Cass Gilbert buildings
Commercial buildings completed in 1928
Georgian Revival architecture in New York City
Office buildings on the National Register of Historic Places in Manhattan